The BYD Han is a mid-size luxury sedan manufactured by the Chinese automaker BYD, available in an all-electric variant and a plug-in hybrid (PHEV) variant.  It is the latest entry of BYD's "Dynasty" series passenger vehicles, and gets its name from the Han Dynasty, the first golden age of Imperial China. A version designated for ride-hailing is also available called the e9, while also serving as the flagship of the BYD e-series products. The Han was teased by the E-SEED GT concept, while the first pictures of a production model named Han were released by BYD in January 2020.

Overview

Concept
The Han was preceded by the E-SEED GT concept car, presented at the 2019 Shanghai Auto Show. The concept version featured gullwing doors, an all-wheel drive layout, and a  time of less than 4 seconds.

Han DM
The Han DM ("dual mode") is the plug-in hybrid variant of the BYD Han, equipped with a  lithium ion battery delivering an all-electric range of  rated by the NEDC. It has a 6-speed dual-clutch automatic transmission and can accelerate from 0 to 100 km/h (0-62 mph) in 4.7 seconds.

There are two versions of Han DM: the basic "Luxury" model (豪华型) costs RMB 219,800 (USD $31,400), while the more featured "Majestic" model (尊贵型) costs RMB 239,800 (USD 34,200) with better stereo systems and extra comfort options.

Han EV
The Han EV ("electric vehicle") is the all-electric variant of the BYD Han, and all its models are designed with a  battery pack, which claims to be rapid-chargeable from 30-80% in 25 minutes.  The Han EV utilizes a new proprietary lithium iron phosphate (LFP) battery design which BYD dubbed the "Blade Battery" (刀片电池), claiming to take up less space than a conventional LFP battery of the same energy capacity.  BYD also emphasized the Blade Battery's safety against thermal runaway even in case of damage, and showed the results of a test in which the battery was pierced with a nail while a raw chicken egg was placed on top of it.  The battery's temperature remained low even after it was pierced, and the egg remained uncooked.

It is powered by a  electric motor that can accelerate from 0 to 100 km/h in 7.9 seconds. There are two versions of this base model: the basic "Luxury" model (豪华型) costs RMB 229,800 (USD $32,800), while the more featured "Majestic" model (尊贵型) costs RMB 255,800 (USD 36,500) with extra advanced driver-assistance systems, blind spot detection, better stereo systems and other comfort options.

e9
Inline with the other e-series products such as the e2, e3, e5 and e6, the BYD e9 was officially launched in March 2021 with one single trim level available, pitching against medium and large pure electric sedans for the high-end online ride-hailing market, subsidized after-sales price in China is 229,800 yuan. It takes 30 minutes to charge the power from 30% to 80% in the fast charge mode. Styling wise, the e9 is largely based on the BYD Han and features different grille insert and logos.

2022 facelift
BYD launched the Han DM-i, Han DM-p, Han EV Founding Edition and Han EV Green Edition on the 10th of April 2022.

Han DM-i and Han DM-p
The Han DM-p is a variant for performance, with a  acceleration time of 3.7 seconds.

Han EV 2022MY

Awards
The Han EV won the 2021 iF Design Award, the first ever sedan model from a Chinese car brand.

References

Han
Sports sedans
Plug-in hybrid vehicles
Production electric cars
Cars of China
Cars introduced in 2020
Front-wheel-drive vehicles
All-wheel-drive vehicles
2020s cars